Virtual Pool 3 is a 3D, first-person sports simulation video game, developed and released for Windows and PlayStation by Celeris.

Overview
The Virtual Pool series made its debut in 1995 with the release of Virtual Pool. From there, Interplay went on to release Virtual Pool 2 in November 1997, adding a wealth of improvements including enhanced physics modelling and a handful of new game types. Virtual Pool Hall soon followed in December 1999, bringing with it the introduction of snooker to the series. It wasn't a perfect break though, as Virtual Pool Hall suffered from poor opponent AI and a lack of a pool hall atmosphere, ironic considering its name.

Initially, Virtual Pool 3 was released as a retail boxed version endorsed by Jeanette Lee, the successful Korean-American professional pool player. Currently the latest version is available on the Celeris site as a download and is still supported via downloadable patches.

Gameplay

The game can be played in single-player mode against the computer (Career Mode, Tournament or Quick Play), or against other human opponents on the Internet or locally through a LAN.

The game features eight billiard venues the player can choose from, which include six pool tables, a snooker table, and a carom table for cushion caroms or three-cushion billiards. There are three preset table configurations available for all games (Championship, Professional or Amateur), but any table can be customized for roll speed and pocket dimensions.

Twenty-one variations are featured in the game, and while most players stick to pool favorites such as nine-ball, eight-ball and straight pool, as well as snooker, the inclusion of less common variations such as cowboy pool, honolulu and bowliards may be of interest to some, especially since finding real-life players of them can be difficult.
	
The games featured in Virtual Pool 3 are as it follows:

 Snooker
 Nine-ball
 Straight pool
 Eight-ball – league
 Eight-ball – midwest
 Eight-ball – bar
 Eight-ball – pub
 Ten-ball
 Six-Ball
 Three-ball
 One-pocket
 Rotation
 Bank pool
 Honolulu
 Cowboy pool
 Bowliards
 Cribbage pool
 Fifteen-ball
 Basic pocket billiards
 Cushion caroms (one-cushion carom billiards)
 Three-cushion billiards

Online play

Players use the GameSpy Arcade client to access the game's main lobby and then create or join virtual rooms where they can participate in online play.

 Challenge Mode creates a winner-stays-on style of play where the creator of the room selects the game and table.
 Normal Mode allows the player to create a room where he, or the previous match winner can set the game type, table and players who play.

The Virtual International Players Ladder (VIPLadder) is a perpetual league for players of games in the Virtual Pool franchise. Players compete in matches to earn points from other VIP Ladder players. As players earn points, they move up the ladder.

Besides other normal leagues ending with playoffs (like the Eight-ball Pub League), there are several regular weekly online tournaments that every player can attend. Each tournament usually takes a few hours, but some  more prestigious tournaments such as the Virtual 9 Ball World Championships and the Virtual Snooker World Championships can take several days or weeks to complete.

Reception

Virtual Pool 3 was mostly very well received by critics, with an average score of 85% at GameRankings, which makes it the highest rated billiards game on Windows, as of 2007. industry standard Video Game aggregator website Metacritic also scored the game well, at another franchise high of 82/100

GameSpot rated the game highly, with an 8.7 out of 10 score, particularly citing the "gorgeous" visuals as well as the "better ball physics and better online support" than the previous titles in the series. However, GameSpot did find that it was "disappointing" that the players were invisible, and not fully rendered (As with all Virtual Pool games). GameSpot wrapped up their review of the game by stating that "you can't find a pool sim that looks and plays as much like the real thing as Virtual Pool 3 does.".

IGN were also highly positive about the game; scoring an 8.5/10, calling Virtual Pool 3 "really a great game", and saying the "great gameplay that will keep you entertained for a long time since", and "it's a whole lot of fun". However, IGN also said that Virtual Pool 3 "won't replace the real thing"

Sequel
Virtual Pool 4 the sequel to the game announced on July 6, 2012, and was released on 15 August 2012 worldwide for Windows. The game was featured many graphical and feature updates from Virtual Pool 3. An online only version of the game was released in 2015 that featured online tournaments and rankings, similar to Virtual Pool 3.

References

External links
 Virtual Pool 3 official website

2000 video games
Interplay Entertainment games
Virtual Pool
Windows games
PlayStation (console) games
PlayStation Network games
Global Star Software games
Multiplayer and single-player video games
Video games developed in the United States